Bandırmaspor is a Turkish professional football club located in the town of Bandırma, Balıkesir Province. The club was founded in 1965 and currently plays in the TFF First League.

Honours
2.Lig
Winners: 2019–20
Play-off winner: 2015–16
3.Lig
Winners: 1974–75, 1988–89, 2009–10

Players

Current squad

Out on loan

References

External links
 Official website
 Bandırmaspor on TFF.org

Football clubs in Turkey
Association football clubs established in 1965
Balıkesir Province
Sport in Balıkesir
1965 establishments in Turkey